Acanthopelma rufescens is a species of spider belonging to the family Theraphosidae (tarantulas). It is native to Central America.

References

Theraphosidae
Spiders of Central America
Spiders described in 1897